Francesco Contin (1585, Lugano, Switzerland – 1654 Venice, Italy) was a Swiss-Italian sculptor and architect.

Contin designed the Palazzo Mocenigo Casa Vecchia on the Grand Canal in Venice, built between 1623 and 1625. He designed the interior of the Church of San Lazzaro dei Mendicanti in Venice (1634–37).

Sources 
 Italian Wikipedia: :it:Francesco Contin.

References 

1585 births
1654 deaths
People from Lugano
Italian people of Swiss descent
17th-century Italian sculptors
Italian male sculptors
17th-century Italian architects
Italian Baroque architects
Architects from Venice
Architects from Ticino